Shinoyama (written: 篠山) is a Japanese surname. Notable people with the surname include:

, Japanese photographer
, Japanese basketball player

Japanese-language surnames